Ordinance Bay is a bay and populated place in English Harbour.

Demographics 
Ordinance Bay has one enumeration district, ED 71900.

References 

English Harbour